François Gayot de Pitaval (1673–1743) was a French advocate.

He compiled a famous collection of causes célèbres. Later the literary genre of true crime collections became known as Pitaval.

Works 
 Causes célèbres et intéressantes, avec les jugemens qui les ont décidées (1734-1741 in 18 volumes)

18th-century French lawyers
1673 births
1743 deaths